Eurelectric (full name: The Union of the Electricity Industry) is the sector association which represents the common interests of the electricity industry at a European level, plus its affiliates and associates on several other continents. Together these organisations employ 970,000 people in the European Union and have a turnover of €627 billion. Formally established in 1989, Eurelectric covers all major issues affecting the sector, from generation and markets to distribution networks and customer issues.

Today, Eurelectric’s main objectives are the realisation of a carbon-neutral electricity mix in Europe well before mid-century, to ensure a cost-efficient, reliable power supply through an integrated market, and the development of energy efficiency and electrification to mitigate climate change.

Eurelectric hosts the Power Summit, an annual conference dedicated to European energy policy.

Organizational structure
Eurelectric is led by a President and two Vice Presidents, who are elected to two-year terms, and a Board of Directors. The Secretary-General leads the Secretariat, which consists of several organisational units employing an international staff of approximately forty people. There are five professional committees and about twenty working groups. 
Eurelectric is a signatory to the EU Transparency Register.

Recognition 
Eurelectric has attracted accolades for its engagement on climate files, with InfluenceMap, an independent think tank, saying in July 2021:

“Deeper research covering a group of 20 key industry associations’ recent engagement with the EU Commission’s Fit for 55 package shows that the power sector has evolved into a leading advocate of an ambitious European climate agenda, with Eurelectric, the utility sector’s primary representative at the EU level, supported by highly progressive, renewables-focused groups.”

It has also been recognised by its peers as a leading association winning the following recent awards:

 Best Data Visualisation, Lens Video Awards 2023
 Best Online Conference/Event, International & European Association Awards 2021
 Best Communications Campaign, International & European Association Awards 2020

Publications 
Each year Eurelectric produces several policy papers covering a variety of the issues concerning the electricity industry, these can be produced by Eurelectric’s Secretariat and membership or in partnership with external partners.

Recent publications include:

 Decarbonisation Pathways (November 2018)
 E-quality: Shaping an inclusive energy transition (June 2020)
 Ports: Green gateways to Europe (July 2020)
 Connecting the dots: Distribution grid investment to power the energy transition (January 2021)
 Accelerating fleet electrification in Europe: When does reinventing the wheel make perfect sense? (February 2021)
 Power2People (November 2021)
 Power sector accelerating e-mobility: can utilities turn EVs into a grid asset? (February 2022)
 Power Plant (June 2022)
 The coming storm: Building electricity resilience to extreme weather (December 2022)

Since 2019, Eurelectric has published the Power Barometer an annual report that compiles industry data on the sector’s progress toward carbon neutrality.

Membership 
Eurelectric currently has over 34 full members, representing the electricity industry in 32 European countries and speaking for more than 3,500 companies in power generation, distribution and supply.

Eurelectric also cooperates with over 40 corporations outside of traditional utilities that have an interest in electrification. Collaboration involves exchanging market experiences, exploring challenges and solutions, and sharing business intelligence. Such activity is carried out through one of Eurelectric’s four business platforms.

 Digitopia Platform – An AI and digitalisation workstream focused on unlocking AI and digital technology’s potential in the power sector.
 European 24/7 Hub – The task-force aims to accelerate power-system decarbonisation by moving towards 24/7 matching in corporate renewable electricity sourcing and market integration. It was launched in partnership with RE-Source platform.
 EVision Business Hub – Connects automakers, charging-point operators, fleet owners, utilities, and technology providers to discuss how to accelerate the uptake of e-mobility across Europe.
 Power to Buildings Business Hub – brings together European power utilities, manufacturers of heating and cooling technologies, flexibility providers, automation and connection solution providers, workforce representatives such as installers and relevant policy associations to enable smart and sustainable buildings across Europe.

References

External links

Electric power in Europe
Electric power industry organizations
International energy organizations
Pan-European trade and professional organizations